Rustamhodza "Rustam" Rahimov (born February 16, 1975 in Dushanbe) is a German former boxer of Tajikistanii origin. He won a bronze medal at the 2004 Summer Olympics

Medals 
 At the 2004 Summer Olympics, Rahimov won the bronze medal in the flyweight boxing event. He was 29.
 At the 2005 World Boxing Championships, he beat American Gary Russell Jr. at bantamweight and won the silver medal.

Olympic results 
1st round bye
Defeated Óscar Escandón (Colombia) 25-15
Defeated Paulus Ambunda (Namibia) 28-15
Lost to Yuriorkis Gamboa Toledano (Cuba) 11-20

References 
 In the olympics
 2004 Summer Olympics, Boxing

1975 births
Living people
Flyweight boxers
Boxers at the 2004 Summer Olympics
Olympic boxers of Germany
Olympic bronze medalists for Germany
Sportspeople from Dushanbe
Boxers at the 2008 Summer Olympics
Tajikistani male boxers
Tajikistani emigrants to Germany
Olympic medalists in boxing
Medalists at the 2004 Summer Olympics
German male boxers
AIBA World Boxing Championships medalists